Thomas Linley the younger (7 May 17565 August 1778), also known as Thomas Linley Junior or Tom Linley, was the eldest son of the composer Thomas Linley and his wife Mary Johnson. He was one of the most precocious composers and performers that have been known in England. A highly talented violinist, Tom Linley was also the most promising of all native English composers between Purcell and Elgar, combining prodigious talent with a delightful personality. He is sometimes referred to as the "English Mozart". His early promise was cut short when he drowned in a boating accident, aged just 22 years.

Early life
Outside of London, Bath was the most fashionable city in late 18th century England and, in Bath, the Linleys were the most influential musical family.
Originally from Gloucestershire and of a modest background (Tom's grandfather was a carpenter/builder whose business later flourished thanks to Bath's urban development), the Linleys quickly became the most prominent artists among the community of musicians providing entertainment to the wealthy tenants of the elegant city. Charles Burney famously described them as "a Nest of Nightingales".

Tom's father, Thomas Linley the elder, who worked as a music and singing teacher, took over the management of the musical performances held at the Assembly rooms in Bath in 1766 and then became musical director of the New Bath Assembly Rooms in 1771. He soon put his children, whose musical education he supervised, to work. First, in 1762, Tom and his sister Elizabeth Ann were selling tickets to the concerts and soon after, as early as 1763, they were performing in front of full houses with their other siblings. Anything earned by the children was commandeered by Linley the elder and the talented youngsters quickly became a major source of income allowing the family finances to prosper and raising their social standing.

Tom's sisters – Elizabeth Ann (born in 1754), Mary (born in 1758) and Maria (born in 1763) – were accomplished singers and actresses. His brother Samuel (born in 1760) was a talented oboist before becoming a sailor. (His youngest brother, William, born in 1771, would also be a musician and, later in his life, a composer).

Tom, whose abilities were apparent from a very young age, played a violin concerto at a concert in Bristol on 29 July 1763 at the age of only 7. The Bath Journal thus advertised on 25 July 1763:
 For the Benefit of Mr. Linley. At Loggan's Room at the Hot Wells on the 29th Inſt. Will be perform’d A Concert of Vocal and Instrumental Music. The Vocal Parts by Mr. Linley, Mr. Higgins and Maſter Linley. The Firſt Violin by Mr Richards of Bath. End of the Iſt Act a Concerto on the Violin by Maſter Linley, a child of ſeven years old. End of the 2nd Act an Elegy of Jackson's by Mr. and Maſter Linley and Mr. Higgins

Tom started to compose soon after. William Boyce, Master of the King's Musick at the time, took him under his wing and Tom studied with him from 1763 to 1768.

From then on, their father always asking for higher fees for them, Tom and his siblings started to appear further afield, notably in charity concerts and oratorios, including in London.

In 1767, Tom appeared at Covent Garden, along with his sister Elizabeth, in Thomas Hull's The Fairy Favour, a masque written for the entertainment of the Prince of Wales, in which Tom sang the part of Puck, danced a hornpipe and played the violin. He must have made quite an impression as the Lloyds Evening Post of 3 February 1767 said of his performance that "[not] enough [could] be said of the little boy [whose] singing, playing on the violin, and dancing [...were] all beyond expectation, and discover extraordinary abilities in one, who must be considered a child".

In may 1768, the famous portrait painter Thomas Gainsborough reported in a letter to William Jackson that "Tommy Linley [was] bound for Italy at the first opportunity"

Journey to Italy
Between 1768 and 1771, Tom journeyed to Italy to further study the violin and composition with Pietro Nardini in Florence. (The Tenor Michael Kelly recounts in his Reminiscenses how, 10 years later, when he met Nardini, the latter "spoke with great affection of his favourite scholar, Thomas Linley, who, he said, possessed powerful abilities.")

In Florence, Tom meets Wolfgang Amadeus Mozart in April 1770 and Charles Burney in September of the same year. In reference to Linley, Burney later wrote, "The Tommasino, as he is called, and the little Mozart, are talked of all over Italy as the most promising geniuses of this age." Tom and Wolfgang, both of them 14-year-old teenagers, formed a close friendship making and playing music together, so much so that, as is explained by Robert Gutman, their separation when Mozart left for Rome was a difficult moment for the both of them, with "a melancholy Thomas follow[ing] the Mozarts' coach as they departed […]" They would never meet again.

About Tom, "der kleine Tomaso", Leopold Mozart writes in one of his letters to his daughter Anna Maria, that he is "ein allerliebster Knab [...] welcher wunderschön spielt" (a very dear boy [...] who plays beautifully). He thus details the whole episode between Tom and Wolfgang:

According to the Mozart-Linley-Kraus 250th Anniversary Festival press release, Linley kept a letter he received from Mozart for the rest of his life.

Career as a musician and composer
Upon his return from Italy in 1771 Tom was soon recognised as one of the best violin virtuosos in Britain and quickly became a leading figure in London's musical life, leading the Bath Chronicle and Weekly Gazette to qualify him as "one of the moſt capital players on the violin in this kingdom" in a review of a concert given on 10 September 1774 in Winchester at the occasion of a three day musical festival. The composer Matthew Cooke, whose Short Account of the late Mr. Thomas Linley Junior preserved inside the covers of a score of one of Linley's works is one of the scarce first-hand sources of biographical information about Tom Linley, states that  "[Tom's] industry and perseverance made him indefatigable. [and that he] was one of the most eminent Violin Performers of the age."

In 1773, one of Tom's cantatas ("In Yonder Grove") was performed at his benefit concert at the Haymarket by his sister Elizabeth and his brother Samuel. The same year he became a leader at Drury Lane until his death in 1778. There, he often played concertos between the acts of operas and oratorios. 1773 also saw the birth of his first large scale work, the ode Let God arise, composed for the Three Choir Festival in Worcester. The piece will be reprised at the same festival in Gloucester in 1775 with additional arias, some of which probably composed for the castrato Venanzio Rauzzini. In Jackson's Oxford Journal of 26 August 1775 an advertising for that prestigious event shows that Tom, who had only just turned 19, was reckoned to have his rightful place among the greatest names, his anthem sitting in the program between Handel's Coronation Anthem and Giardini's new oratorio:

 GLOCESTER MUSIC MEETING.
 THE Meeting of the Three Choirs of Gloceſter, Worceſter and Hereford, for the Benefit of the Widows and Orphans of the poor Clergy of the three dioceſes, will be held at Gloceſter, on Wedneſday the 13th day of September, and the two following days.
 At the Cathedral, on Wedneſday morning, a Sermon will be preached by the Hon. and Right Reverend the Lord Biſhop of Landaff [sic.]: A TE DEUM and JUBILATE adapted to muſic of the moſt eminent Italian compoſers; an ANTHEM by Dr. Boyce; and Mr. Handel's CORONATION ANTHEM will be performed.- In the evening, at the Booth-hall, the Oratorio of ISRAEL IN EGYPT, and between the two parts of the Oratorio a MISCELLANEOUS ACT, conſiſting of SONGS, by Signior [sic.] Rauzzini and Miſs Linley, and Inſtrumental Pieces by Meſſrs Giardini, Fiſcher, and Croſdill.
 On the Thursday morning, at the Cathedral, Mr Handel's Dettingen TE DEUM and JUBILATE and CORONATION ANTHEM, and an ANTHEM compoſed by Mr. Linley, jun.- In the evening, at the Booth-hall, the Oratorio of RUTH, compoſed by Mr. Giardini, which has never been performed at theſe meetings; a SOLO on the VIOLIN by Mr. Giardini, and an OBOE CONCERTO by Mr. Fiſcher.
 On Friday morning, at the Cathedral, the MESSIAH.- In the evening, at the Booth-hall, a Grand MISCELLANEOUS CONCERT, conſiſting of capital Songs and Choruſes, and Inſtrumental Pieces.
 Principal Vocal Performers:- Miſs Linley; the much-admired Signior Rauzzini, principal Singer in the ſerious Opera; Miſs Salmon, Miſs Radcliffe, and the Female Chorus Singers from the North; Meſſ. Norris, Matthews, and Price.
 Inſtrumental:- Meſſrs Giardini, Fiſcher, Croſdill, Malchair, Parke; the other parts of the Inſtrumental Band by the moſt approved Performers now in England.
 The Choruſſes are intended to be particularly full.
 The whole to be conducted by Mr. ISAAC.
 The Performers are desired to be in Gloceſter on Sunday evening, in order to rehearſe on Monday morning, the IIth, and to dine the ſame day with the Stewards, at the King's-head.
 The Hon. JOHN TRACY, D. D.-
 Sir WILLIAM GUISE, Bart. – Stewards

Tom carried on performing under his father both in Bath and in London at the Drury Lane. For instance, on Thursday 16 March 1775 the Bath Chronicle and Weekly Gazette published the following advertising:

 BATH. 
 AT the NEW ROOMS, on Friday March 17, will be performed the celebrated ODE of ALEXANDER's FEAST 
 Set to muſic by Mr. HANDEL. 
 The firſt violin by Mr. Linley, jun. The principal vocal parts by Miſs Linley, Miſs M. Linley, Mr. Linley, Mr. Brett, Mr. Matthews, and Maſter Samuel. 
 Between the Iſt and 2d parts, a Miſcellaneous Act.- Organ Concerto.- Song, Miſs Linley.- Concerto Violin, Linley, jun.- Duetto Sacchini. 
 To Subſcribers five tickets for one guinea. Single tickets at 5s. each, to be had at the Upper and Lower Rooms, the Pump-Room, and Rookfellers, where Books of the performance may be had at 6d. each.
 To begin at half paſt ſix o'clock. 
 At Mr. Gyde's Rooms on Friday March 24, the celebrated Entertainment of ACIS and GALATEA.- With additional pieces, as will be expreſſed in the bills.
But Tom also occasionally "led the band", as stated by the Bath Chronicle and Weekly Gazette of 29 February 1776 in a glowing review of the representation of Handel's Acis and Galatea.

The Duenna or the Double Elopement was a collaboration between Sheridan, who wrote the play, and Tom Linley who produced the majority of the music, composing some (for instance the overture), and, in a pasticcio manner, adapting and arranging famous airs from contemporary operas and other tunes selected by Sheridan and Elizabeth Ann. Music from his father is also present in the work. It opened in Covent Garden in November 1775 to great success, with 75 performances in its first season and a total of 254 in the 18th century. Samuel Johnson declared it one of "the best two comedies of [his] age". Its popularity was such that King George III brought his family to see it several times and Garrick allegedly lost most of his audience at the nearby Drury Lane Theatre. It was so successful that it remained on stage all over Britain for more than 60 years, until the middle of the 19th century.

From then on the scale of Tom's works expends dramatically. In 1776, he writes his Shakespeare Ode, also known as Ode on the Witches, Fairies and Aerial Beings of Shakespeare. The piece attracts the most enthusiastic review in The Morning Post of 21 March 1776 which declares that "The composition must be allowed to be an extraordinary effort of genius in so young a man [...] the fugue of the overture is masterly [...] the song “There in old Arden’s inmost shade" [...] would not disgrace a Sacchini or Bach [...] the oboe song in the second part [...] shews this young composer has the brilliancy and warmth of invention so peculiar attendant on the spring of life [...] His merit, even at this early time of life, is certainly sufficient to challenge the warmest encouragement from the public, even though our Amateurs should not yet be brought to overlook the misfortune of his being – an Englishman".

According to Matthew Cooke, by this time ("between the years 1771 and 1776"), Tom Linley had "composed no less than Twenty Concertos for the violin [...and] many of these [...had been] performed by him [...] at Drury Lane [...] and [...had been] received with the most unbounded applause."

In 1777 he composes what is usually viewed as his master-piece: an oratorio about the crossing of the Red Sea, The Song of Moses, which is reprised in 1778 in a slightly modified version.

Sheridan's production of Shakespeare's play The Tempest at the Drury Lane theatre in 1777 gave Tom the opportunity to compose new incidental music for it, including, in lieu of the first scene, a Storm Chorus ("Arise, ye spirits of the storm") that the musicologist Roger Fiske deemed "one of the most remarkable achievements in English music". According to the Mozart-Linley-Kraus 250th Anniversary Festival press release, "[it] was performed in London representations of that play for about forty years after Linley’s death, before it was [...] supplanted by Henry Bishop’s [...] Tempest." In addition to that chorus, Linley also composed an air for Ariel's first appearance in the play, re-arranged some of the play's established music, including some of the numbers written by Thomas Arne, and wrote a separate setting of "Hark, hark, the watch-dogs bark" in which in the instruments of the orchestra are meant to somewhat render the sound of dogs barking and of cockerels.

Contrary to the prior resounding success of The Duenna, his last stage work The Cady of Bagdad (1778) was a relative failure.

Musical style
Tom Linley's music is both typical of works by English composers of his time and remarkably idiosyncratic for a composer who died at such a young age. A significant number of Linley's compositions have been lost, including many in the Drury Lane Fire of 1809. However, according to Gwilym Beechey (author of the article on Tom Linley in the New Grove Dictionary and editor of some of his music), the works that survived attest to "his fluent and congenial melody, his contrapuntal facility, and his imaginative orchestration."

Not unlike other English composers of the second half of the 18th century, the inevitable influence of Handel is evident in his choral works (for instance in Let God Arise), however his choral writing also has its very own assurance, strength. inventiveness, artistry and finesse. Linley's writing is as fluent in choral-like choruses as in elaborate fugues or evocative tableaux. Tom was only about 15 years old when he composed the not only incredibly skilful but magnificent double-fugue "Wonderful Art Thou", quite a deed for a teenager! Musician Peter Holman, who worked on the Hyperion recordings of Linley's music, reckons that, in The Song of Moses, "[Linley's music] has a grandeur and sweep that makes its subsequent neglect hard to understand."

His vocal writing and the sophisticated orchestration of his vocal music, though rooted in the influence of Johann Christian Bach's galant style and Arne's later music as well as the Italian operatic music still very much en vogue at the time, is full of creativity, freshness and renewed ingenuity. For instance, his orchestral cantatas, in the style of the ones composed by Arne and others for the pleasure gardens of Vauxhall and the likes, delight with their particularly refined obligato instrumental parts that either playfully intertwine with the singers' voice (for instance, the virtuosic oboe in the airs 'Fly, Damon, to yon secret grove' and 'If thy too-cruel bow be bent') or colour the piece with subtle echoes of poetically charged evocations (the french horn in the air 'Wrapt close from harm' in the cantata Ye nymphs of Albion's beauty-blooming isle).

The vocal and orchestral writing in his stage works also displays qualities found in music usually composed by more mature composers; his ability to intensify the protagonists’ characterisations is certainly a very remarkable one. The music to The Duenna, though written in haste, has been reckoned to not only "save the comic opera from shallowness", but be the main reason of its success. However, it is to be noted that Johnson, Byron and Hazlitt regarded Sheridan's text as among the finest comedies and that Prokofiev and Roberto Gerhard also set it to music.

His only surviving violin concerto was most probably composed after his return from Italy as it has little to do with concertos he would have known before. The en-vogue Italianate galant style – inspired by the likes of Nardini, Lolli, Giardini and many others – pervades the whole composition, however Linley's imaginative and creative writing also transpires in his way of mixing passages of extreme technical demands on the soloist (virtuosic and complex musical lines set above the 5th position, long continuous passages of double-stops, octave scales, rapid extreme register jumps, etc.) with bare stark sober – almost plain – moments (the 'Scotch' of the second movement, the introduction of the theme by the soloist in the first movement, or the ending of the third movement in a quiet ritornello that not only does not bring the usual strong resolution expected at the end of a concerto but leaves us in suspens or 'hanging on'). His fresh approach to colourful orchestration both in terms of instrumentation and harmony (in particular the harmonic progressions in cadences and suspensions) also makes his concerto quite distinctive.

His only surviving violin sonata also attests to Tom Linley's fantastic mastery of the instrument, with phenomenal technical difficulties including playing most of the time at the extreme upper register of the instrument (three octaves above middle C, or even higher), long passages of double-stops, rapid arpeggios across the full register of the instrument, quick jumps of more than two octaves, fast scales in alternate octaves, etc, making it quite a bravura piece in the spirit of a capriccio, despite its sonata form.

The orchestration in his last major work, the incidental music to The Cady of Bagdad, "shows Tom becoming more experimental, particularly in his writing for brass and winds." Conductor Peter Leech adds that "it is tempting to speculate about the directions [Linley's] musical imagination would have taken", had he lived longer.

The Music to The Duenna or The Double Elopement

The birth of the comic opera The Duenna was not an easy one, despite both Sheridan's and the Covent Garden director's enthusiasm; almost 50 years had passed since the success of The Beggar's Opera, and comic operas had lost their popularity. But Sheridan's play The Rivals, created in January 1775, had been such a great success that they thought that a new comedy by the same author, to which would be added musical interludes, could not fail.

It seems that Sheridan had originally planned for his father-in-law, Thomas Linley Sr, to write the music. However the composer did not seem to share the enthusiasm. Firstly, he doubted the possible success of a comic opera. Secondly, to Linley Sr's frustration, Sheridan was only giving him isolated songs to set to music, judiciously keeping him in the dark about the play's subject by avoiding to communicate the whole libretto to the composer, undoubtbly because of the resemblance it bore to Sheridan's own elopement with the composer's daughter, Elizabeth. Finally, Linley Sr was hoping to "take over [...] the Lentent Oratorio seasons at the Drury Lane Theatre" and therefore may have been reluctant to take on a project at the Drury Lane's direct rival, Covent Garden.

With the date of the premiere approaching and not much work completed, Linley Sr resolved to ask his son Tom Linley to help with composing the music. Tom ended being the chief contributor to The Duenna's music, composing about a third of the total. On top of which he arranged and edited the folk songs selected by Sheridan and Elizabeth and the additional arias by other composers, his father's input representing a bit more than a quarter of the whole opera. It is to be noted that despite the haste in which they were composed, Tom Linley's songs were not just beautiful but they played a paramount role in the success of The Duenna by deepening the characterisation of the protagonists of the play.

Linley Sr eventually agreed to go to London to assist with the rehearsals, but he "insisted for the Linley name not to be associated with the opera". Composer Andrew Edwards suggests that, though pasticcios of the kind were common practice, Linley Sr seems to have "disapprov[ed] of the way the music had been [...] put together", however the subject of the play – as mentioned above – might also have played its part.

If the original text of Sheridan's libretto rapidly slipped into unreliable, corrupted and "debased" versions due to its complex copyright and publication history, according to William Davies (editor of Tom Linley's music for some of the Hyperion recordings and author of the first critical edition of Tom Linley's 1778 opera The Cady of Bagdad), the state of The Duennas music is even "more fragmentary". Of the overture originally published in 8 parts a bassoon part is missing in the first and third movements. Thanks to the memorial edition of his works in 1780, Tom Linley's full score of his own numbers has survived. In addition to that, an autograph copy of Act III also exists, though it is missing the finale. However only one of the borrowed arias survived in full score. The rest of the music only survived in the frustrating format of vocal scores (Queen Charlotte's 1775 manuscript copy and the 1776 published one) which do not provide much aside from the vocal line and a crude skeleton accompaniment (mainly the bass line) with little to no mention of instrumental or orchestration details. The vocal score published by Broderip & Wilkinson in 1800 seems to be a simple re-edition of the 1776 one by C.&S. Thompson, without any amendment or addition. Finally, the vocal score published 1835, though it reinstated some of the musical numbers lost at the turn of the century, further diluted the original music by adapting it to the new singing conventions and musical taste.

The list of music and composers below was established by Andrew Edwards based on "the volumes of Tom's music which Thomas Senior and George III commissioned after his death and on [...] the manuscript sources by Roger Friske [sic.] and [...] William Davies."
Color keyModern representations:'''
Oct.-Nov. 2010: ETO Baroque Orchestra. Richard Stuart (Don Jerome), Charlotte Page (Louisa), Damian Thantrey (Ferdinand), Nuala Willis (Margaret, the Duenna), Olivia Safe (Clara), Joseph Shovelton (Antonio), Adrian Thompson (Isaac), Jonathan Gunthorpe (Carlos), Adam Tunnicliffe (Masquerader). Conductor: Joseph McHardy. Stage director: Michael Barker-Caven. Designer: Adam Wiltshire. Lighting Designer: Guy Hoare. Assistant Director: Oliver Baird. Movement Director: Yael Loewenstein.

 Works 
 Stage works 

 Other vocal works 

 Instrumental works 

Death
Tom was a host of the Duke of Ancaster with his sister Mary and "his Companion Mr. Olivarez, Italian Master" – maybe the Spanish violin virtuoso and composer Juan Oliver y Astorga – at Grimsthorpe Castle in Lincolnshire, when he drowned in a boating accident "just three months after his 22nd birthday".

The press reported the circumstances of his death as follows:Drewry's Derby Mercury, Friday 14 August 1778:On the 5th Inſtant a melancholy Accident happened at Grimſthorpe in Lincolnſhire, the Seat of his Grace the Duke Ancaſter:- Mr. Thomas Linley, eldeſt Son of Mr. Linley, one of the Proprietors of Drury-lane Theatre, Mr. Olivarez, an Italian Maſter, and another Perſon, agreed to go on the Lake in his Grace's Park, in a Sailing Boat, which Mr. Linley ſaid he could manage very well; but no ſooner had they ſailed into the Middle, than a ſudden Squall of Wind ſprung up, and overſet the Boat; however, they all hung by the Maſt and Rigging for ſome Time, till Mr. Linley ſaid, he found it was in vain to wait for Aſſiſtance, and therefore, though he had his Boots and Great Coat on, he was determined to ſwim to Shore, for that purpoſe he quitted his Hold, but had not ſwam above 100 Yards before he ſank to the Bottom, and was unfortunately drowned. Her Grace of Ancaſter ſaw the Whole from her Dreſſing-Room Window, and immediately diſpatched ſeveral Servants off to take another Boat to their Aſſiſtance, which unfortunately came only Time enough to save Mr. Olivarez.- Mr Linley remained under Water near 40 Minutes, ſo that every Effort made uſe of to resſtore him to Life proved ineffectual. – This Accident has deprived the Profeſſion to which he belonged of one of its Principal Ornaments, and Society of a very accompliſhed and valuable Member.Jackson's Oxford Journal, Saturday 15 August 1778:On Wedneſday the 5th Inſtant, Mr. Thomas Linley, eldeſt Son of Mr. Linley, one of the Proprietors of Drury-lane Theatre, fell out of a Boat into a Lake belonging to his Grace the Duke Ancaſter, at Grimſthorpe in Lincolnſhire, and was unfortunately drowned. The Circumſtances of his Death are thus related by a Perſon just arrived from Grimſthorpe: Mr. Linley and Mr. Olivarez, Italian Maſter, and another Perſon, agreed to go on the Lake in a Sailing Boat, which Mr. Linley ſaid he could manage; but no ſooner had they ſailed into the Middle of the Lake, than a ſudden Gale of Wind ſprang up, and overſet the Boat; however, they all hung by the Maſt and Rigging for ſome Time, till Mr. Linley ſaid he found it was in vain to wait for Aſsiſtance, and therefore, though he had his Boots and Great Coat on, was determined to ſwim to Shore, for which Purpoſe he quitted his Hold, but had not ſwam above a hundred Yards before he ſunk. Her Grace the Ducheſs of Ancaſter ſaw the whole from her Dreſsing-room Window, and immediately ordered ſeveral Servants to take another Boat, and go to their Aſsiſtance, but they unfortunately only came early enough to take up Mr. Olivarez, his Companion, not being able to find the Body of Mr. Linley for more than forty Minutes.— Miſs M. Linley came up to Town with the melancholy Tidings of the Diſaster, and now lies dangerously ill at the Duke of Ancaſter's in Berkeley-ſquare; Mrs Sheridan is likewiſe inconfortable [sic.] for the Loſs of ſo valuable a Brother; and Yeſterday Mr. Linley his father whoſe Sufferings on the Occaſion no Language can expreſs, went down to pay the laſt Tribute to a beloved Son.Ipswich Journal, Saturday 15 August 1778
On Wednesday laſt a moſt melancholy accident happened at Grimſthorpe, the Duke of Ancaſter's ſeat in Lincolnſhire. As Mr. Linley, jun. (who with his ſiſter was ſpending the ſummer there with the Duke and Ducheſs) was in a veſſel uppon a large piece of water in the park, by some unſkilful management, the wind being high, the veſſel ſunk, and Mr. Linley, in endeavouring to ſwim on ſhore, was unfortunately drowned. His body was taken up in about 40 minutes, and every poſſible method (according to Mr. Hawes's plan) uſed for his recovery; but unfortunately without ſucceſs.

Tom's funeral was held at Edenham parish church and there is a burial plaque to his memory inside the church of St Michael and all the Angels but parish records seems to indicate that he was not buried there. Local rumour has it that his body may have been taken to Bath to be interred.

Tom's death was a shock to his contemporaries and was immediately recognised as both a human tragedy and a tragedy for the Arts and for English music in particular. A memorial edition of his works was commissioned by King George III.

In his memoirs the Irish tenor Michael Kelly remembers how, in about 1786 after a concert in Vienna, he happened to be sitting at supper between Mozart and Constance Weber, and how Mozart, to whom he was being introduced for the first time, "conversed with [him] a good deal about Thomas Linley ... with whom he was intimate at Florence, and [how Mozart] spoke of him with great affection... [saying] that Linley was a true genius; and [that] he felt that, had he lived, he would have been one of the greatest ornaments of the musical world."

Discography
Despite its remarkable quality and idiosyncrasies, the music of Tom Linley is not widely known.
There are however a few commercial recordings in existence, most of them published by the independent British classical label Hyperion and its subsidiary label Helios. 
 A Lyric Ode on the Fairies, Aerial Beings and Witches of Shakespeare, The Parley of Instruments, Paul Nicholson (Helios, CDA66613, 2005)
 Cantatas & Theatre Music (Music for The Tempest, Overture to The Duenna and the three cantatas: In Yonder Grove, Ye Nymphs of Albion's beauty-blooming isle and Daughter of Heav'n fair art though) Julia Gooding, The Parley of Instruments, Paul Nicholson (Helios, CDA66767, 2006)
 The Song of Moses & Let God arise, The Parley of Instruments, Peter Holman (Helios, CDA67038, 2008)
 The song "To heal the wound a bee had made" is available on Enchanting Harmonist – A soirée with the Linleys of Bath, Rufus Müller, Invocation (Hyperion, CDA66698, 1993)
 A Violin Sonata in A major is available on English 18th-century Violin Sonatas, The Locatelli Trio (Hyperion, CDA66583, 1992)
 His only surviving violin concerto (Violin Concerto in F major) is available on English Classical Violin Concertos, Elizabeth Wallfisch, The Parley of Instruments, Peter Holman (Helios, CDH55260, 2008)

Another recording of Linley's Violin Concerto in F major is available on the label Oehms Classics:
 Mozart in Italien, Mirjam Contzen, Reinhard Goebel (Oehms Classics, OC 753, 2010)

Another recording of the Lyric Ode is available on the label Philips Classics:
 A Shakespeare Ode on the Witches and Fairies, Musicians of the Globe, Philip Pickett (Philips Classics, 446–689–2, 1998)

Two arias from The Tempest ("Come Unto these Yellow Sands" and "Faithful Ariel") – wrongly attributed by the publisher to Thomas Linley the elder – are available on the label Navona Records:
 The Shakespeare Concerts Series, Vol. 5: Full Fathom Five, Andrea Chenoweth, Stephen Hammer, Arcadia Players, Ian Watson (Navona Records, NV5996, 2015)

The aria "O bid your faithful Ariel fly" from The Tempest is also available on the label Eloquence:
 Eighteenth-Century Shakespearean Songs, April Cantelo, English Chamber Orchestra, Raymond Leppard (Eloquence, ELQ4824765, Decca 4824765, 1961)''

Notes

References
 New Grove Dictionary of Music and Musicians, 2ª Ed. (2001)
 British Newspaper Archive
 The British Library
 Library of The Royal Academy of Music
 
 
 
 
 Mozart Letters and Documents (Mozart Briefe und Dokumente) – Online Edition
 Beechey, G. (1968). Thomas Linley, Junior. 1756–1778. The Musical Quarterly, 54(1), 74–82.
 
 
 
Troost, Linda V. (1986). "The Characterizing Power of Song in Sheridan's The Duenna". Eighteenth-Century Studies. 20 (2): 153–172. ISSN 0013-2586.
R. Fiske: ‘A Score for The Duenna’, ML, 42 (1961)
C. Camden: ‘Songs and Choruses in The Tempest’, Philological Quarterly, 61 (1962)
G. Beechey: Thomas Linley, Junior: his Life, Work and Times (diss., U. of Cambridge, 1965)
G. Beechey: ‘Thomas Linley, Junior, 1756–1778’, MQ, 54 (1968)
R. Fiske: ‘The Duenna’, MT, 117 (1976)
G. Beechey: ‘Thomas Linley, 1756–78, and his Vocal Music’, MT, 119 (1978)
H.D. Johnstone and R. Fiske, eds.: Music in Britain: the Eighteenth Century (Oxford, 1990)

External links
 
 Mozart-Linley-Kraus 250th Anniversary Festival press release
 Thomas Linley the Younger on the Eighteenth Century English Music website
 1776 Edition of the libretto of The Duenna
 1775 Chamber edition of the musical score to The Duenna
 The Linleys of Bath by Clementina Black

See also

1756 births
1778 deaths
18th-century composers
18th-century British male musicians
18th-century English people
English composers
Accidental deaths in England
Child classical musicians
Classical-period composers
Thomas
Boating accident deaths
People from Bath, Somerset
British classical musicians
British male violinists
British violinists
English classical musicians
English classical violinists
English violinists
Male classical violinists